A tabby cat is a cat with a distinctive coat and informally to refer to any domestic cat, particularly a female one.

Other common uses:

 Tabby concrete, a building material
 Tabby weave, a fundamental textile pattern

Tabby may also refer to:

People
 nickname of Frank Booth (English footballer) (1882–1919)
 nickname of Tabetha S. Boyajian (born c. 1980), American astronomer
 Tabby Callaghan (born 1981), Irish musician
 nickname of William Tabby Wynyard (1867–1938), New Zealand rugby union footballer
 Tabby-To-Kwanah or Tabby (1789–1898), leader of Timpanogos Native American tribe

Fictional characters
 A character in the .hack//Roots anime series
 A character in Monster Warriors
 Tabby, a Disney character in the Donald Duck universe
 Tabby Maxwell-Brown, a character in the British soap opera Hollyoaks in 2016 and 2017
 nickname of Tabitha Smith, a Marvel Comics character associated with the X-Men

Other uses
 Showa/Nakajima L2D, Japanese license-built versions of the Douglas DC-3 transport aircraft given the Allied code name Tabby during World War II
 Tabby concrete, a building material
 OSVehicle Tabby, an open source vehicle design
 Tabby weave, a fundamental textile pattern
 The Tabernacle, a concert venue in Atlanta
 Pseudergolis wedah or Tabby, a butterfly species
 Tabby the tiger, mascot of Marietta High School (Ohio)

See also
 Hamilton Tiger-Cats, a Canadian Football League team nicknamed the "Tabbies"
 Tabby Tabby Island, Queensland, Australia - see List of reduplicated Australian place names

Lists of people by nickname